Lander is one of the 21 municipalities (municipios) that makes up the Venezuelan state of Miranda and, according to a 2007 population estimate by the National Institute of Statistics of Venezuela, the municipality has a population of 135,739. The town of Ocumare del Tuy is the municipal seat of the Lander Municipality.

Demographics
The Lander Municipality, according to a 2007 population estimate by the National Institute of Statistics of Venezuela, has a population of 135,739 (up from 117,819 in 2000). This amounts to 4.7% of the state's population.

Government
The mayor of the Lander Municipality is José Gregorio Arvelo, elected on October 31, 2004, with 53% of the vote. He replaced Manuel Garcia shortly after the elections. The municipality is divided into three parishes; Ocumare del Tuy, La Democracia, and Santa Bárbara.

References

Municipalities of Miranda (state)